Silver Lake is a census-designated place (CDP) in Cumberland County, New Jersey, United States. It is in the northern part of the county, in the southwest part of Upper Deerfield Township. It is bordered to the west by the Cohansey River, which forms the boundary with Hopewell Township, to the north by Seeley, and to the south by Sunset Lake.

Silver Lake was first listed as a CDP prior to the 2020 census.

Demographics

References 

Census-designated places in Cumberland County, New Jersey
Census-designated places in New Jersey
Upper Deerfield Township, New Jersey